Hate for Sale is the eleventh studio album by English-American rock band The Pretenders. It was released on July 17, 2020 by BMG Rights Management. It has received positive reception from critics.

Recording and release
Lead single "The Buzz" was released on March 17, 2020 and the album was announced for a May 1 release. A five-month North American tour with Journey, announced in 2019, was originally slated to begin May 15, 2020. On March 24, 2020, Hate for Sale was delayed to July 17 due to the impact of the COVID-19 pandemic on the music industry; the band shared their The Damned tribute "Hate for Sale" the same day. "You Can't Hurt a Fool", was released, as a single, for free on April 14, 2020. On May 12, 2020, they released their third single "Turf Accountant Daddy."  "Don't Want to be This Lonely", release May 28, 2020, was the fifth and final single from the album.

It is the first Pretenders album since 2002's Loose Screw to feature original member Martin Chambers, who was absent on Break Up the Concrete and Alone. It also marks the return of producer Stephen Street, who worked on the band's albums in the 1990s.

Keyboardist Carwyn Ellis and pedal steel guitarist Eric Heywood are not featured on the recording or the album artwork.

Critical reception

 Album of the Year sums up critical consensus as 76 out of 100 with 13 reviews and AnyDecentMusic? gives the release a 7.3 out of 10.

Wayne Perry of Associated Press considers Hate for Sale "among the best this legendary band has ever produced" with special attention to James Walbourne's guitar work and songwriting. For the London Evening Standard, Rachel McGrath rated the album a four out of five stars, calling out several tracks and Walbourne's musicianship as well. American Songwriters Hal Horowitz gave the same score, writing that Chrissie Hynde is as relevant and talented as ever in her over 40years as a performer. Writing for The Arts Desk, Asya Draganova also points out Hynde's vitality as a punk musician and sums up the album as "a fun, melodic, and memorable listen".

Track listing
All songs written by Chrissie Hynde and James Walbourne
"Hate for Sale" – 2:30
"The Buzz" – 3:51
"Lightning Man" – 2:57
"Turf Accountant Daddy" – 3:05
"You Can't Hurt a Fool" – 3:19
"I Didn't Know When to Stop" – 2:24
"Maybe Love Is in NYC" – 3:25
"Junkie Walk" – 2:45
"Didn't Want to Be This Lonely" – 2:56
"Crying in Public" – 3:17

Personnel
The Pretenders
Martin Chambers – drums
Chrissie Hynde – guitars, vocals, harmonica
James Walbourne – guitars, vocals, keyboards
Nick Wilkinson – bass guitar

Additional personnel
John Davis – mastering
Duke Quartet
Matt Holyoak – photography
Stephen Street – production, mixing, keyboards, percussion
Stuart Crouch Creative – design, artwork

Charts

See also
List of 2020 albums

References

External links

2020 albums
Albums postponed due to the COVID-19 pandemic
Albums produced by Stephen Street
BMG Rights Management albums
The Pretenders albums